Jan Gerritsz. Bicker (1591–1653) was a merchant, a mayor (burgomaster) and a member of the Bicker family, an influential patrician family from Amsterdam.

De Bickers were part of the staatsgezinde partij (the pro-republican party) and opponents of the stadtholders, who belonged to the House of Orange-Nassau. Jan Bickers son-in-law, the influential Grand Pensionary Johan de Witt practically controlled the Republic during the First Stadtholderless Period in 1650–1672.

Biography

Family 
  

Jan  Bicker was a son of Gerrit Bicker, and brother of Cornelis and Andries Bicker, both influential merchants and burgemeesters of the city. His older brother Jacob was lord of Engelenburg. 

Bicker was married to Agneta de Graeff van Polsbroek, a sister of Cornelis de Graeff. Four daughters were born from this marriage:
 Elisabeth Bicker married Jacobus Trip, a wealthy arms dealer
 Geertruida Bicker married Jean Deutz, a very rich Banker of Amsterdam
 Wendela Bicker married Johan de Witt
 Jacoba Bicker married her full cousin Pieter de Graeff

Career
 

Jan Bicker was for his time a wealthy man. He act as a shipbuilder and merchant in Amsterdam. His trade mainly was focussed on the Levant. Aside from Baarn he also had countryhouses in Beverwijk: Akerendam (1637) and Duynwijck. Within the city of Amsterdam, Jan Bicker owned almost an entire island, called the Bickerseiland. He bought the island in 1631 and had an enormous house with a high tower built there so that he could see his ships arrive. He lived on Keizersgracht (221). 

Jan Bicker was the cities inspector of the ropes, and in 1647 he became Schepen. When stadtholder William II attacked the city in 1650, one of his demands was that the Bickers voluntarily resigned their positions. The brothers were never burgemeester at the same time, but they had made agreements about an alliance, the so-called Bickerse ligue. After William II died in that same year, the Bickers regained their position during the First Stadtholderless Period. When Andries died, Jan was given the position of burgemeester, but did not keep it for long. 

Several ownerships of Jan Bicker, amongst which the countryhouse 'De Eult' in Baarn, eventually later fell into the hands of the stadtholders.

References

1591 births
1653 deaths
Businesspeople from Amsterdam
Dutch States Party politicians
Mayors of Amsterdam
Jan
Nobility from Amsterdam